Chicoreus crosnieri is a species of sea snail, a marine gastropod mollusk in the family Muricidae, the murex snails or rock snails.

Description

Distribution
This marine species occurs off Madagascar.

References

External links
 MNHN. Paris: holotype
 Houart R. (1985). Report on Muricidae (Gastropoda) recently dredged in the south-western Indian Ocean-I. Description of eight new species. Venus. 44(3): 159-171

Muricidae
Gastropods described in 1985